Rose Windross originally began as a singer and songwriter in the UK reggae scene. She recorded her first album, Just Rose, on the Ital Records label when she was still at school.

Windross both wrote and recorded Soul II Soul's first single "Fairplay" for Jazzie B, which is featured on the album, Club Classics Vol. One. In the US, although the single was pressed, "Fairplay" was never officially released as a single there, but it appeared on the B-side to the single "Feel Free".

In 1996, she performed vocals on Dpd's (one of Dillon & Dickins's aliases) cover version of Terence Trent D'Arby's "Sign Your Name" which was released on Higher State's sublabel 99 North.

Windross joined her brother Norris Windross in 1999 to launch W Records through his own booking agency, Da Boss Entertainments.

References

External links
Rose Windross on Discogs
Myspace.com

Year of birth missing (living people)
Living people
British reggae musicians
20th-century Black British women singers
UK garage singers
English people of Guyanese descent
Soul II Soul members